Jim Matthews may refer to:

Jim Matthews (politician), former member of the Montgomery County Board of Commissioners
Jim Matthews (rugby league), former NSWRL player of the 1960s
Jim Matthews (sportsman) (1919–1999), tennis player and VFL footballer
Jim Matthews (trade unionist) (died 1969), British trade union leader
Jimmy Matthews (1884–1943), Australian Test cricketer and VFL footballer
Jim Matthews (footballer, born 1880) (1880–1940), Australian rules footballer in the VFL
Jim Matthews (racing driver), American driver in the 2007 and 2008 Rolex Sports Car Series season
 Murder of Jim Matthews, 2022 murder of Detroit anchorman

See also
James Matthews (disambiguation)